Cepo is a municipal administrative units, formerly known as communes in the Gjirokastër County, southern Albania. At the 2015 local government reform it became a subdivision of the municipality Gjirokastër. The municipal unit administrative center is Palokastër village and it consists on 10 other villages which are: Fushëbardhë, Zhulat, Taroninë, Mashkullorë, Çepun, Kodër, Plesat, Kardhiq, Prongji and Humelicë.

History
In 1185 the seat of the Orthodox bishopric of Dryinopolis was moved to Cepo until 1395 when it was transferred to Argyrokastron (modern Gjirokastër).
In Medieval times, Zhulat was the home of Papa Zhuli, a Catholic priest who is credited for the Kanun of Laberia.

Demographics
The population at the 2011 census was 1,727, while in the civil registers of the same year the population had a total of 6,702 inhabitants. In 2018, referring to the same civil registry, the population had a slight decline, counting a total population of 6,224. Historically speaking, Çepo had a mixed Muslim and Christian (Albanian Orthodox) population, with greater numbers of Muslims. Humelica was inhabited by a historically Christian population, Fushë Bardhe and Zhulat were inhabited by historically Muslim populations, and much of the rest of the commune is of mixed historical confession. In the 2011 census, a plurality (44.72%) the population did not identify with one of Albania's four major denominations, while of the major four, Çepo had 42.79% Muslims, 9.44% Orthodox, 2.2% Bektashi, and 1.85% Catholic.

References

Former municipalities in Gjirokastër County
Administrative units of Gjirokastër